This is a discography of the English indie folk band from Twickenham, London, England Noah and the Whale which contains four studio albums, two extended play and ten singles.

After the release of a few singles, the band's debut album, entitled Peaceful, the World Lays Me Down, was released on 11 August 2008. The release made it to Number 5 on the official UK Albums Chart. Doug Fink, brother of singer, Charlie, originally played drums but left to pursue a career as a doctor. Until mid-2008, Laura Marling was a member of the band and performed with them as much as her solo touring schedule allowed. She also performed the background vocals on the band's debut album but left the band several months after its release.

From January 2009 onwards, the band started work on their second full-length LP, entitled The First Days of Spring. Along with the album release, Charlie Fink wrote and directed a film that runs the entire length of the album, also entitled The First Days of Spring. Fink decided not to feature female backing vocals on their second LP due to the painful but inspiring departure of Laura Marling to pursue a solo career. Her separation from the band did however inspire a change from their traditional sound, signaling a new direction in the band's music and lyrics. The album was released on 31 August 2009, a little over a year after their debut. Three days prior to the release Doug Fink, brother of lead singer Charlie, announced he would be leaving the band to pursue a career in medicine. At the same time Fred Abbott was brought in on second guitar/piano and Doug was temporarily replaced by former Pull Tiger Tail drummer Jack Hamson.

In January 2010, it was announced that Noah and the Whale were heading to the recording studio soon to prepare their third album, for which the band was considering the title Old Joy, however, in an interview with the website SoonerMusic.com, lead singer Charlie announced that the album would be called Last Night On Earth. On 3 December 2010 the band released a track from the upcoming album on their official website, titled "Wild Thing". The first official single from the album, "L.I.F.E.G.O.E.S.O.N.", was released on 23 January 2011, peaking at number 14 in the UK Singles Chart. Last Night on Earth was released on 7 March 2011 through Mercury Records. In 2011 the song "Waiting for My Chance to Come" was used in the series finale for the UK teen drama Skins.

In January 2013, the band announced that they will be releasing a new album, entitled Heart of Nowhere on 6 May 2013.

Albums

Studio albums

Notes

Extended plays

Singles

Notes

References

External links
 Official website

Discographies of British artists